This is a list of the first-level administrative divisions of Vietnam by Human Development Index as of 2020.

See also 
 List of Vietnamese regions by Human Development Index
 List of countries by Human Development Index

Notes

References

Ranked lists of country subdivisions
Human Development Index